The 1908 Wellington City mayoral election was part of the New Zealand local elections held that same year. The polling was conducted using the standard first-past-the-post electoral method.

Background

In 1908 former Mayor John Aitken launched a fresh campaign to regain the position but was defeated by the incumbent Mayor Thomas William Hislop.

Mayoralty results
The following table gives the election results:

Notes

References

Mayoral elections in Wellington
1908 elections in New Zealand
Politics of the Wellington Region
1900s in Wellington